Marcel Meeuwis (born 31 October 1980) is a Dutch former professional footballer who played as a midfielder.

Career
Meeuwis played for amateur club Taxandria, and made his debut in professional football in the 2000–01 season at Willem II. During his second season for Willem II, Meeuwis only played four games. In the summer of 2002, he moved to VVV-Venlo in the Eerste Divisie, where he played a larger number of matches. Meeuwis played for VVV for a total of four seasons, growing into one of the team's key players.

Meeuwis moved to Roda JC in the Eredivisie in 2006, where he signed a contract until 2012. He announced his transfer to Borussia Mönchengladbach for the up-coming season on 18 May 2009. He signed a three-year contract and joined his new club on 1 July 2009.

On 8 February 2013, it was announced he had signed with A-League club Melbourne Heart on a three-month contract.

Career statistics

References

1980 births
Living people
Dutch footballers
Association football midfielders
VVV-Venlo players
Roda JC Kerkrade players
Willem II (football club) players
Feyenoord players
People from Goirle
Borussia Mönchengladbach players
Eerste Divisie players
Eredivisie players
Bundesliga players
Melbourne City FC players
A-League Men players
Dutch expatriate footballers
Dutch expatriate sportspeople in Germany
Expatriate footballers in Germany
Footballers from North Brabant